Don't Fall in Love with Everyone You See is the first full-length studio album from alternative folk-rock group, Okkervil River. Released on January 22, 2002 on the label Jagjaguwar, it contains the single, "Kansas City". Artist William Schaff, not to be confused with lead singer Will Sheff, designed the cover art. The album features an array of instruments including violin, pedal steel, mellotron, banjo, string and horn sections.

The mandolin murder ballad "Westfall" stems from Sheff's recollections of the Yogurt Shop Murders, four grotesque murders of teenage girls in Austin, Texas by college students, and the subsequent trials. The song was written around the lines "They're looking for evil / Thinking they can trace it / But evil don't look like anything."

Track listing

Personnel 
Okkervil River
 Jonathan Meiburg – Bass, accordion, tambourine, wurlitzer
 Will Sheff – Vocals, guitar, mellotron, harmonica, organ ("Dead Dog Song")
 Zachary Thomas – Mandolin, bass (electric), vocals, string bass
 Seth Warren – Drums, vocals, spoons, taragat

Guest musicians
 Alex Arcone – Saxophone ("Red")
 Ethan Azarian – Banjo
 Brian Beattie – Organ, organ (Hammond)
 Scott Blesner – Violin
 Michael Crow – Trumpet ("Lady Liberty")
 Peter Elliot – Trumpet ("Lady Liberty")
 Daniel Johnston – Vocals ("Happy Hearts")
 Channing Lewis – Saxophone ("Lady Liberty")
 Gary Newcomb – Pedal steel
 Ashley Rath – Violin ("Listening to Otis Redding at Home During Christmas")
 June Rhee – Violin ("Listening to Otis Redding at Home During Christmas")
 Alice Spencer – Vocals
 Brian Standefer – Cello ("Listening to Otis Redding at Home During Christmas")

Technical personnel
 Brian Beattie – Producer, engineer, mixing
 Mark Pedini – Layout design
 William Schaff – Artwork, layout design
 Will Sheff – Layout design
 Billy Stull – Mastering

References

External links
Album summary from Okkervil River
Omaha Weekly interview (February 27, 2002)

2002 debut albums
Okkervil River albums
Jagjaguwar albums